The Key of Life is a 1928 novel by the British writer Francis Brett Young. It was part of a group of cultural works that acknowledged a new Egyptomania in the wake of the discovery of Tutankhamun tomb by Howard Carter in 1922.

Ruth Morgan, a young woman living in a village in the Welsh borders, falls in love with an archaeologist working on a nearby dig after he falls ill. She follows him to Egypt where he is employed on a major excavation.

References

Bibliography
 Michael Hall. Francis Brett Young. Seren, 1997.

1928 British novels
Novels by Francis Brett Young
Novels set in Egypt
Heinemann (publisher) books
Alfred A. Knopf books